Jovana Peković (born 16 January 1998) is a Montenegrin judoka. She qualified to represent Montenegro at the 2020 Summer Olympics in Tokyo 2021, competing in women's 78 kg.

References

External links

 

1998 births
Living people
Montenegrin female judoka
Judoka at the 2020 Summer Olympics
Olympic judoka of Montenegro
Sportspeople from Nikšić